The Dukha or Dukhan language is an endangered Turkic variety spoken by approximately five hundred people of the Dukhan (a.k.a. Tsaatan) people in the Tsagaan-Nuur county of Khövsgöl Province in northern Mongolia.  Dukhan belongs to the Taiga subgroup of Sayan Turkic (which also includes Tuvan and Tofa). This language is nearly extinct and is only spoken as a second language. The ISO 639-3 proposal (request) code was dkh, but this proposal was rejected.

It is mostly related to the Soyot language of Buryatia. Also, it is related to the language of Tozhu Tuvans and the Tofa language. Today, it is spoken alongside Mongolian.

Dukhan morphophonemic units are written with capital letters, similar to its sister languages and standard grammars.

Origin 
The Dukha language or Dukhan is an endangered Turkic language. It is spoken by about five hundred people of the Dukhan (also Tsaatan) from Tsagaan-Nuur County, Tsagaannurr (Khövsgöl) Mongolia. Цагааннуур сум) is a Sum (district) of Mongolia in the province of Khövsgöl, located in Northern Mongolia.

Classification of the Turkic languages

Current situation 
Currently, the Dukhan language is mainly related to an amalgam of dialects from the nomadic people of Inner Mongolia, China, Russia, and surrounding areas.

 Buryat is a Mongolian language spoken in Russia (in the Republic of Buryatia), and by smaller populations in Mongolia and China, in the east of Inner Mongolia. It is the language of the Buryats.
 Tuvan (or Tuvine, Tuvinian) is a language of the Turkic family spoken by nearly 200,000 Tuvans in the Republic of Tuva, Russia. Small groups speak Tuvan in Mongolia and China. Tuvan contains many words borrowed from Mongolian and has been influenced by Russian over the last hundred years.
 Tofalar (or Tofa, Karagas) is a Turkic language spoken in the Ninjnewinsk region of the Irkutsk Oblast in Russia.

Bibliography 
 Dolatkhah, Sohrab. 2016. Let's talk qashqay. In: "Let's talk" collection. Paris: The Harmattan.
 Dolatkhah, Sohrab. 2016. The qashqay: Turkic language of Iran. CreateSpace Independent Publishing Platform (online).
 Pierre-François Viguier, Elements of the Turkish language, or analytical tables of the usual Turkish language, with their development, dedicated to the King, under the auspices of M. The Comte de Choiseul-Gouffier, Ambassador of His Most Christian Majesty near the Ottoman Gate, by M. Viguier, Prefect Apostolic of the Establishments of the Congregation of the Mission in the Levant, Constantinople, from the Imprimerie du Palais de France, March 1790, in-4 °

References 

Siberian Turkic languages
Languages of Mongolia
Endangered Turkic languages
Turkic languages